The following lists events that happened during 1896 in South Africa.

Incumbents
 Governor of the Cape of Good Hope and High Commissioner for Southern Africa:Hercules Robinson.
 Governor of the Colony of Natal: Charles Bullen Hugh Mitchell.
 State President of the Orange Free State: Pieter Jeremias Blignaut (until March 4), Martinus Theunis Steyn (starting March 4).
 State President of the South African Republic: Paul Kruger.
 Prime Minister of the Cape of Good Hope: Cecil John Rhodes (until January 13), John Gordon Sprigg (starting January 13).
 Prime Minister of the Colony of Natal: .

Events

January
 2 – Leander Starr Jameson and his forces surrender at Doornkop near Krugersdorp.
 6 – Cecil Rhodes is forced to resign as Prime Minister of the Cape Colony for his involvement in the Jameson Raid.

February
 19 – A train carrying 56 tons of dynamite explodes at Braamfontein, Johannesburg, killing more than 78 people.

May
 13 – The Franchise Bill is passed by Natal's Legislative Assembly, disfranchising natives of other countries.

June
 5 – Mohandas Karamchand Gandhi embarks from Durban for Calcutta en route to Bombay.

August
 6 – Cape Town's first electric tram service begins operation along Adderley Street to Mowbray Hill.

December
 18 – Mohandas Karamchand Gandhi arrives back in Durban with his wife and two sons, but the ship is placed under a 5-day quarantine because Bombay was declared a plague-infected port. Quarantine will later be extended to 13 January 1897.

Unknown date
 South Africa's first school of mines is opened in Kimberley. It will later form the core of the University of the Witwatersrand in Johannesburg.

Births
 12 January – Matthys Stefanus Benjamin Kritzinger, an Afrikaans literator and lexicographer, is born in the district of Carolina, Eastern Transvaal.
 1 February – Stephanus Le Roux Marais, organist, teacher and composer of Afrikaans songs, is born in the district of Bloemfontein.
 1 February – Ivan Mitford-Barberton, art teacher at the Michaelis School of Art in Cape Town and sculptor of several monuments in South Africa, is born in Somerset East.
 April – Clements Kadalie, trade unionist, is born at Chifira, Nkhata Bay District, Nyasaland (now Malawi).
 3 May – Petrus Johannes Lemmer, composer of Afrikaans songs, is born in Hartbeesfontein, Transvaal.

Deaths
 17 September – Nicholaas Waterboer, Griqua chief and eldest son of Andries Waterboer, dies in Griekwastad.

Railways

Railway lines opened
 1 February – Cape Eastern – Sterkstroom to Indwe, .
 1 April – Transvaal – Kaapmuiden to Barberton, .
 2 November – Transvaal – Krugersdorp to Frederikstad, .

Locomotives
Cape
 Two new Cape gauge locomotive types enter service on the Cape Government Railways (CGR):
 The first of a second batch of fifty 6th Class 4-6-0 steam locomotives. In 1912 they would be designated Class 6A on the South African Railways (SAR).
 The first of a second batch of forty-six 7th Class 4-8-0 Mastodon type locomotives on the Midland and Eastern Systems. In 1912 they would be designated Class 7A on the SAR.
 Two 4-6-2 Pacific type tank locomotives enter service on the Metropolitan and Suburban Railway that operates a suburban passenger service between Cape Town and Sea Point.

Free State
 The Oranje-Vrijstaat Gouwerment-Spoorwegen places  the first of twenty-four new Cape 6th Class  steam locomotives in service. In 1912 they would be designated Class 6C on the SAR.

Natal
 The Natal Government Railways (NGR) rebuilds one of its Class G  tank locomotives to the first 4-6-4 Baltic type locomotive in the world. It was later designated the NGR Class H.

Transvaal
 The independent Pretoria-Pietersburg Railway in the Zuid-Afrikaansche Republiek (Transvaal Republic) places the first of three  saddle-tank locomotives in service.

References

 
South Africa
Years in South Africa